The Mendijur Ornithological Park is located in Alava, Basque Country, Spain. The park has trails and bird blinds for visitor use. The park consists of mainly of wetlands, along with forested areas, making it a home for wide variety of waterfowl and other birds. Frequently spotted birds include various egrets and grebes, grey herons, and white storks.

External links 
Official site

Tourist attractions in Álava
Ornithology
Geography of Álava
Parks in Spain